Naome Kibaaju (born 1 June 1950) is a Ugandan management personnel and a  politician in the 10th Parliament of Uganda. She is the woman member of parliament of Sheema County North, Sheema District. She belongs to the ruling National Resistance Movement (NRM) political party.

Background and education 
In 1962, she completed her Primary Leaving Examinations at Bweranyangi Girls Primary School. In 1969, she sat for East African Certificate of Education at Bweranyangi Girls Senior Secondary School. In 1970, Naome attained the East African Advanced Certificate of Education at Trinity College Nabbingo. She later joined Makerere University and graduated with Bachelor of Arts in Political Science and Social Administration in 1974.In 1978, Naome went back to Makerere University for Diploma in Public Administration. In 1998, she graduated with Master of Arts in Gender and Development from Makerere University.

Early career 
Between 1998-1999, she served as the board member of Uganda Women's Efforts to Save Orphans (UK Chapter). She worked as the Assistant Secretary at the Office of the President from 1975 to 1980. In 1980-1990, she worked as the Senior Assistant Secretary at the Office of the Prime Minister. In 1991-1996, she was employed as the Principal Assistant Secretary at the Ministry of Finance, Planning and Economic Development. Between 1997 to 1998, she worked as the under secretary at the Education Service Commission.In 1998-2000, she served as the board member of Ankole Western University. In the period of 1999-2000, she was the Vice Lady Captain of Uganda Golf Club. Between 1999 and 2010, she was the  Under secretary at Ministry of Defence. In 2012-2016, she served as the board member of National Enterprise Corporation. From 2016 to date, she is the board member of National Medical Stores. From 2017 to date, she sits on the board membership of Uganda Micro Finance Regulatory Authority.

Political life 
From 2018 to date, she is the member of the parliament of Uganda. Kibaaju was elected to the parliament after beating Guma Nuwagaba who belonged to the opposition Forum for Democratic Change (FDC) party with 11,326 against 7,322 votes. The Sheema North Parliamentary seat fell vacant when the then area MP, Elioda Tumwesigye resigned in August after being elected the MP for the newly created Sheema Municipality. On 6 November 2018, she took her oath administered by the Deputy Speaker of Parliament, Jacob Oulanyah. She was then handed a copy of the Constitution and the Parliament Rules of Procedure by Oulanyah.

Naome Kibaaju beat Guma Nuwagaba by a little over 4,000  votes to win the Sheema North constituency by-election. The total number of valid votes cast was 18, 648 while the invalid votes were 125 with twenty-eight (28) ballot papers spoilt. The county had a total of 65 polling stations. She was described by NRM chairman President Yoweri Museveni as an honest and trusted person who worked in defense for many years before joining politics.

Three people were nominated to contest for the Sheema North parliamentary seat ahead of the 8 October election. The three people included; Naome Kibaaju who was nominated on the NRM ticket, Guma Nuwagaba was nominated on the FDC ticket after defecting from NRM and Felix Mujuni was accepted to contest as an Independent political party.

Guma Nuwagaba 
Guma Nuwagaba aged 44, was born in Buringo, Masheruka Sub-county, Sheema District. He went to Buringo Primary School, St Mukasa Preparatory Seminary for upper primary and Kitabi Seminary for O-Level and A-Level. He studied Bachelors' of Arts in Social Sciences at Makerere University. In 1998, he was elected the Bushenyi District youth councillor. In 2002, he was elected the Kigarama Sub-county councillor and served up to 2006. He was appointed the Mitooma RDC in 2014.

Personal details 
She was a married woman.

See also 
 Uganda Microfinance Regulatory Authority
 Uganda National Medical stores
 Sheema District
 List of members of the tenth Parliament of Uganda
 Parliament of Uganda
 Elioda Tumwesigye
 Ephraim Kamuntu
 Jacklet Atuhaire

External links 
 NRM’s Naome Kibaaju wins Sheema North by-election
 Website of the Parliament of Uganda

References 

1950 births
Women members of the Parliament of Uganda
National Resistance Movement politicians
Makerere University alumni
People from Sheema District
Members of the Parliament of Uganda
People from Western Region, Uganda
Living people